{{Speciesbox
| image = Southern_Leopard_Frog,_Missouri_Ozarks.JPG
| status = LC
| status_system = IUCN3.1
| status_ref = 
| genus = Lithobates
| species = sphenocephalus
| authority = (Cope, 1889)
| synonyms = *Rana sphenocephala Cope, 1886Rana halecinaHolbrook, 1842Rana halecina sphenocephalaCope, 1886Rana utricularia sphenocephalaPace, 1974
}}Lithobates sphenocephalus or Rana sphenocephala, commonly known as the southern leopard frog, is a medium-sized anuran in the family Ranidae (the true frogs). It is native to eastern North America from Kansas to New York to Florida. It is also an introduced species in some areas. This species lives in cool, clear water in the north, whereas in the south it occurs in warmer turbid and murky waters of coastal and floodplain swamps, twilight zones of caves, and abandoned mines.

 Description 
It is green or brown in color with a yellowish ridge along each side of the back. Rounded dark spots occur on the back and sides; a light spot is seen on each eardrum. The male has larger fore limbs than the female. The breeding male's vocal sacs are spherical when inflated. The call is described as a "ratchet-like trill", "chuckling croak", or a "squeaky balloon-like sound".

The larva is mottled, and the eyes are positioned on the top of the head. The female lays an egg mass that is "baseball-sized" when close to hatching time, and contains up to 1500 eggs.

 Ecology and behavior 
This frog lives in many types of shallow freshwater habitat and sometimes in slightly brackish water. It is usually found close to water, but it can stay on dry land for long periods of time. During warmer months, it moves away from the water for most of the time, It is mostly nocturnal, but it can be active during the day and the night, especially during rainfall. It breeds in the winter and spring, and sometimes in the fall; heavy periods of rainfall trigger breeding. The egg mass is connected to aquatic vegetation. It typically nests communally in cooler weather, and individually in warmer weather. Communal egg deposition in cooler temperatures is thought to be an adaptation for increased egg and embryo survival, creating a thermal advantage, similar to that of the Wood frog.  Eggs hatch in 4 days to nearly two weeks. It has been shown that L. sphenocephalus eggs hatch more quickly in response to the presence of predators such as crayfish. The tadpoles take 50 to 75 days to develop to adulthood.

In northern parts of its range, it is dormant during the winter, where it remains in well-oxygenated, unfrozen water bodies.

Southern leopard frogs feed primarily on insects, crayfish, and other invertebrates. They forage in upland areas during the summer. In other parts of their range, their diet consists mainly of spiders, beetles, and gastropods such as snails.

Range
This frog is widespread across eastern North America, especially the Southeast US. It is the most common frog in Florida and several other regions. It is an introduced species in the Bahamas and at two locations in California. Southern leopard frogs are believed to have been introduced to the Prado Flood Control Basin via a shipment of aquatic fauna to the Chino Gun Club in 1929 or 1930; they are now common in areas of the basin undergoing urbanization. A second established population of the species in California is now suspected, following the March 2016 discovery of two females in the San Joaquin River just northwest of Fresno on the border between Madera and Fresno Counties.

 Subspecies 
The subspecies are:L. s. sphenocephalus – Florida leopard frog L. s. utricularius'' – Southern leopard frog

Gallery

References

Further reading
 AmphibiaWeb, available at http://amphibiaweb.org/

 

 

 
 
 

Lithobates
Amphibians described in 1886
Fauna of the Southeastern United States